This list of fictional plants describes invented plants that appear in works of fiction.

In fiction
Audrey Jr.: a man-eating plant in the 1960 film The Little Shop of Horrors
Audrey II: a singing, fast-talking alien plant with a taste for human blood in the stage show Little Shop of Horrors and the 1986 film of the same name
 Bat-thorn: a plant, similar to wolfsbane, offering protection against vampires in Mark of the Vampire.
Biollante: a monster plant of titanic proportions in the movie Godzilla vs Biollante.
Bush of many uses: a bush native to Vergon 6 in Futurama.
Cactacae: sentient races of cactus people from China Miéville's Bas-Lag series (unlike the real xerophyte family Cactaceae).
Dyson tree: a hypothetical genetically-engineered plant (perhaps resembling a tree) capable of growing on a comet, suggested by the physicist Freeman Dyson
Flower of Life: a flower featured in some anime series: The Super Dimension Cavalry Southern Cross, Robotech or Nurse Angel Ririka SOS
 G'Quan Eth: plant indigenous to the Narn homeworld, used as incense in religious ceremonies from Babylon 5 TV series. It is ritually burned as incense, and its seeds are a narcotic for Centauri when dropped in alcohol. The G'Quan Eth plant is "difficult to grow, expensive to transport, very expensive to own." Whether it affects other species in this way when in alcohol is not clear, but we know that Narn don't seem to use it as a recreational drug (Londo chides G'Kar for Narns "It's a shame you Narns waste them, burning them as incense") and that it is illegal to possess on B5 except in religious contexts. The plant is presumably named after Narn spiritual leader G'Quan.
Inkvine: a creeping plant frequently used to whip in the slave cribs in the Dune universe
Integral Trees: enormous trees from the science-fiction novel The Integral Trees by Larry Niven. They are 100 kilometers long and have a leafy "tuft" at each end oriented in opposite directions forming an ∫, the integral symbol.
Kite-Eating Tree: a tree featured in the comic strip Peanuts
Krynoid: extraterrestrial carnivorous plant in episode "The Seeds of Doom" from Doctor Who TV series
 Mariphasa lupina lumina (Wolf Flower): an extremely rare selenotropic, phosphorescent plant found only in the mountains of Tibet from the movie Werewolf of LondonPlant Men of Barsoom: a race of humanoid plants from the Martian novels of Edgar Rice BurroughsRe-annual plants: plants in Terry Pratchett's Discworld series which, due to a rare 4-dimensional twist in their genetic structure, flower and grow before their seed germinates.Red weed: a red plant from Mars brought to Earth possibly accidentally by the invading Martians in the novel The War of the Worlds by H. G. Wells.Sapient pearwood: a rare species of plant in Terry Pratchett's Discworld series. When sapient pearwood is crafted into an item, the product gains a semblance of magical life, and becomes devoted to the owner. Snake vine: an odd-looking vine with dusky, variegated leaves hunkered around a stem that winds a stranglehold around nearby trees, eventually killing them from the Sword of Truth fantasy series by Terry Goodkind. It will bite at nearby creatures, leaving deadly toothlike thorns that burrow into their skin and eventually kill them. There is actually a plant commonly called by this name that is native to Australia. See Snake vineSerenna veriformans: a fictional plant that appears in the novel and movie Jurassic Park. There has never been reported a prehistoric fern genus named Serenna or a veriformans species. The word vermiform usually refers to something that is worm-like, like in Vermiform appendix. In the movie the plant is not a fern but an angiosperm.
Sukebind: fictional flower in the novel Cold Comfort Farm by Stella Gibbons.
Tesla trees: large electrified trees from the planet Hyperion in Hyperion Cantos novels by Dan Simmons. They appear to store up electricity inside their body during certain seasons, releasing all of it in huge arcs of lightning from their crown, burning away all that was growing or walking near them and thus getting fertilizer.
Tree-of-Life: the ancestor of yams, with similar appearance and taste, from Larry Niven's Known Space novels.
Triffids: carnivorous plants which possess a whip-like poisonous sting as well as mobility by three foot-like appendages, from the novel The Day of the Triffids (1951) by John Wyndham. They subsequently appeared in a radio series (BBC, 1960), a motion picture (1962), a TV series (BBC, 1981) and a sequel novel, The Night of the Triffids (2001) by Simon Clark.

In J. R. R. Tolkien's Middle-earth

Aeglos: a plant, similar to a gorse named for the Elvish 'snow-thorn'
Athelas: a healing plant with long leaves (also known as Kingsfoil or asëa aranion)
Elanor: a small star-shaped yellow flower from Tol Eressëa and Lothlórien
Mallorn: a huge tree with green-and-silver leaves turning golden in autumn and remaining so till spring, upon which the Elves of Lothlórien housed
Nimloth: the White Tree of Númenor, a seedling of Celeborn, a seedling of Galathilion, created in the image of Telperion
Niphredil: a small white flower from Doriath and Lothlórien
Pipe-weed:  "a strain of the herb nicotiana" (tobacco), varieties mentioned include Longbottom Leaf, Old Toby, Southern Star, grown in the Shire, and Southlinch, from Bree
Oiolairë: an evergreen fragrant tree highly esteemed by the Númenóreans
Simbelmynë: a white flower that grew in Gondolin and Rohan (also known as Evermind and Alfirin)
Valinor, Two Trees of: magic trees that illuminated the Blessed Realm in ancient times

In J. K. Rowling's Harry Potter series

 Bowtruckle
 Leaping toadstool
Gillyweed: seaweed-like plant which, when you eat it, allows you to breathe underwater for a short period of time. You also temporarily grow fins and flippers.
Gurdyroot: resembles a green onion. Basis for a foul-tasting purple infusion brewed by the Lovegoods in order to fend off Gulping Plimpies. Considered not very original by Charles Elliott, depending on a funny name for effect.
Mandrakes: tubers that look like babies when young. Their screams can kill when fully grown. A potion made from mature mandrakes can restore victims who have been petrified. A different kind of mandrake is a real plant. Whilst the mandrake as it appears in the books and films is fictional, J. K. Rowling’s description does reflect genuinely held beliefs about the mandrake, in particular, the danger surrounding its screams. This led to the practice of using dogs to collect the mandrake and the blocking of ears during collecting.
The whomping willow: a tree which has club-like branches which can move. The whomping Willow is very hostile in the Harry Potter and the Chamber of Secrets book; Harry Potter and Ron Weasley crash into it with a car, and are lucky to escape alive. There is a secret passage that leads into the Shrieking Shack, a haunted house, underneath the whomping Willow's roots.

In Brandon Sanderson's Cosmere Series 

On the planet Roshar (The Stormlight Archive)

 Firemoss: A red-brown moss that, when activated by rubbing between the thumb and forefinger, releases wisps of smoke that create feelings of euphoria when inhaled and is used as a recreational drug. Firemoss is highly addictive, limiting its medicinal use, though it is sometimes used to reduce cranial swelling and offer pain relief.
 Knobweed: Like most of the plants found on Rohsar, knobweed has adapted to survive the planet’s harsh storms. The reed-like stalk anchors itself directly to stone and the frond found at the top of the stalk has the ability to contract and retreat into the stalk during storms for protection. Knobweed reproduces by releasing fluffy pappuses that carry seeds into the air. The milky white sap found inside knobweed stems is a natural and highly valuable antiseptic used in the field and by established apothecaries.
 Prickletac: Prickletac plants are actually colonies of much smaller living buds. As each generation of buds dies it converts to a hard, stony material which the next generation builds upon. Prickletac’s reproductive system is based on this oddity – when a ‘limb’ grows too large it breaks off and falls to the ground, scattering living buds. Also known as Twisted Spine.
 Rockbuds: Rockbud is both a general term for several shelled plants on Roshar, including Lavis Polyps, Vinebuds, and Prickletac Shrubs, and the proper name for a specific plant. The true Rockbud plant is a shelled plant containing lengthy tendrils that reach out to lap up water (and occasionally animal blood). The size of fully grown rockbuds depends largely on climate. In colder climates they grow no larger than a human fist, while rockbuds in warm climates can grow to the size of a barrel. Rockbuds are harvested for consumption, limited medicinal uses, and paper making.
 Shalebark: A class of stony, fanlike plants often used for decoration and landscaping.

On the planet Nalthis (Warbreaker)

 Tears of Edgli: Vibrantly colored flowers that grow only in the temperate T’Telir climate. Highly valuable both economically and magically.

On the planet First of the Sun (Sixth of the Dusk);

 Unnamed Telepathic Trees: Many flora and fauna on this planet communicate with a form of natural telepathy. Certain unnamed plants living on the islands that make up the Pantheon send false thoughts of wounded or frightened animals to attract predators, which often fight and leave victims dead near enough to the tree to provide nutrition. These plants are not directly carnivorous.

On the planet Taldain (White Sand Series)

 Dorim vines: Dorim vines live under the sand that covers most of Taldain's Dayside continent, reaching down to the water table where they fill themselves with water as a defensive mechanism against predators – the hard shells of many of the continents animals is dissolved by contact with water. Pouring water onto sand draws nearby vines out of the ground.

In Dungeons & Dragons
The role-playing game Dungeons & Dragons has a number of imaginary, according to Charles Elliott "not-very-ingenious", plant species, as well as "a taxonomy of fungal horrors", which Ben Woodard considers eerie not only for their poisonous nature, but because many have the ability to move.

Basidirond: a giant multi-stemmed fungus creature
Hangman tree: a tree that will attempt to strangle anyone who ventures under it
Kelpie: a shape-shifting mass of animate seaweed that can imitate a woman or other creatures, and drowns its victims
Myconid: A "race of [man-sized] sentient fungus creatures", "some of which pack a mean punch", and which have the "ability to spray poisons that can disable their foes".
Oaken defender: an enormous disk-shaped plant that lives in dryad groves and assists in their defense
Obliviax: "memory moss", a black moss that steals memories from intelligent creatures
Phantom fungus: a dangerous subterranean plant that grapples victims with tentacles
Shambling mound: an atrocious plant-like creature, also called a shambler
Shrieker: Ambulatory fungus, which "can be used as cheap alarm systems for Underdark societies, but they possess no combat abilities of their own. The only thing a shrieker can do is shriek". Scott Baird from Screen Rant ranked the man-sized shrieker among the weakest monsters in the game.
Tendriculos: an enormous, savage, sentient plant resembling a huge, tangled shrubbery
Treant: sentient trees with human characteristics that typically protect forests from antagonists
Vegepygmy: a "mold man", a former human transformed by russet mold
Wood woad: a creature resembling big, burly, bestial men made entirely of wood and bark bearing, but without foliage
Yellow musk creeper: a creeping plant that drains the intelligence of its victims, killing them or turning them into "yellow musk zombies" under the plant's control

In Monty Python's Flying Circus
The following plants appear in the David Attenborough sketch of the last Monty Python episode.
 Angolan sauntering tree (Amazellus robin ray).
 Gambian sidling bush.
 Puking Tree of Mozambique.
 The Turkish little rude plant.
 Walking tree of Dahomey (Quercus nicholas parsonus).

In the 2009 film Avatar
Plants in Pandora have evolved according to the characteristics of their environment, which has an atmosphere that is thicker than on Earth, with higher concentrations of carbon dioxide, xenon and  hydrogen sulfide. Gravity is weaker in Pandora, thereby giving rise to gigantism. There is a strong magnetic field, causing plants to develop 'magnetotropism'. A particularly intriguing quality of flora and fauna in Pandora is their ability to communicate with each other. This is explained in the movie as a phenomenon called 'signal transduction', pertaining to how plants perceive a signal and respond to it.

In video games
Video games frequently feature fictional plants as items that can be collected by the player, or occasionally appear as non-player characters.

 The Monster Hunter series has multiple fictional flowers and plants that can be gathered by the player character, including nulberries, might seeds, flowferns, and dragonstrike nuts.
The titular plants from the Plants vs. Zombies series, which are used to defeat zombie enemies.
 The Legend of Zelda series, plants play a significant role. In many games, bomb flowers allow the player character to explode rocks and obstacles. In Breath of the Wild in particular, the game is full of flowers and herbs that convey different abilities to Link, including the Silent Princess, Princess Zelda's favourite flower. The series also contains the Great Deku Tree, a guardian tree that watches over the forest in multiple games in the franchise.
Broc Flower: a plant in Fallout: New Vegas used as a medical remedy.
Plantera: a flower from the game Terraria which is used to be a two phase bossfight, when it is at 51% health and higher it is in its first phase moving towards the player and firing seeds, but when the player decreases its life to 50% it enters phase two, bursting a mouth with many sharp teeth, spawning biters and spores.
Candypop Bud: a flower found in the video games Pikmin and Pikmin 2.
Chuck the Plant: a plant found in several of LucasArts' games.
Elowan: a race of plant-like creatures in Starflight computer game.
Flowah: A Sunflower With the elements of plant and fire from the game My Singing Monsters. Flowah Makes A "Who Gochu" vocal sound.
Potbelly: Potbelly is a green venus flytrap with the element of plant from the game My Singing Monsters. Potbelly Makes A "Bap" Or "Bah" Vocal Sound.
Flowey: A sentient golden flower who is one of the main antagonists from the game Undertale. Flowey has no soul and in the neutral route Flowey consumes 6 human souls to become Photoshop Flowey, the final boss of that route.
Genesis Trees: trees located in the world of Legaia from the video game Legend of Legaia. They have the power to keep a large area free of the Mist.
Laganaphyllis simnovorii: a carnivorous cow-like plant found in The Sims series of games, commonly known as the Cowplant.
Lunar Tears, from Nier and Nier: Automata, by PlatinumGames.
Nirnroot: Is a very rare plant with strong alchemical properties from The Elder Scrolls series of video games. Appearing as a blueish green plant that emits a constant hum.
Piranha Plants: plants with mouths from the Mario series of video games, often depicted as sentient. It is also a playable character in Super Smash Bros. Ultimate.
Wumpa fruits: Collectible fruits from Crash Bandicoot.
Fire Flower another famous flower from Mario series of videogames, used to enable Mario to shoot fire balls.
Supox utricularia: a race of kind, sentient plant creatures from Star Control computer game series.
Xander Root: a plant in Fallout: New Vegas used as a medical remedy.
Sylvari: a race of sapient plant people in the MMO Guild Wars 2, available as a playable race.

In DC comics
The Black Mercy is an extraterrestrial hallucinogenic plant used a weapon by the supervillain Mongul. Mongul first uses it in "For the Man Who Has Everything", a story by Alan Moore and Dave Gibbons that was first published in Superman Annual #11 (1985). The story was later adapted into the Justice League Unlimited episode of the same name. Supergirl has an episode called "For the Girl Who Has Everything", where in this version the plant was sent by Kryptonian Non. The story also served as an inspiration for the episode of Krypton, "Mercy", where in this version the plant was put on Lyta-Zod by her son from the future, General Zod. Described in the original story by Mongul as "something between a plant and an intelligent fungus", the Black Mercy attaches itself to its victims in a form of symbiosis, and feeds from the victim's "bio-aura". The organism is telepathic, and reads its victim's heart's desire, giving them a logical simulation and an ending that the victim wants, which the victim experiences an entirely immersive, virtual experience in which their actual surroundings are masked to them. According to Mongul, victims are capable of "shrugging off" the hallucination, though some find the experience too compelling to do so unaided.

The Black Mercy is typically depicted as consisting of dark green, thorned vines that attach themselves to a humanoid victim's upper torso, with a set of pink flowers, each with a long, red, tentacle-like stigma, growing in the center of the victim's chest. When Mongul first uses the Black Mercy on Superman, they burrow through his costume and into his body, able to penetrate his otherwise invulnerable skin because, Wonder Woman senses, they are at least partially magical, which is one of Superman's weaknesses. During his experience with the organism, Superman's breathing appears faint, and his ability to sense the fraudulent nature of the simulation it feeds him and fight it manifests as tears produced by his actual eyes. The Black Mercy can be pulled off a victim by a strong humanoid such as Batman, and Mongul uses special protective gauntlets to handle the plant safely. Superman is not able to awaken from the Black Mercy's simulation without help from Batman, though Oliver Queen and Hal Jordan are both able to do so in a subsequent storyline when they are both trapped by the same plant, as this meant that the two were sharing an illusion and Hal's strength of will caused Oliver to experience what Hal believed was his friend's greatest desire rather than Oliver making the choice himself.

In the video game Injustice 2, Supergirl mentions Black Mercy in pre-battle dialogue with Scarecrow. She states dealing with him is no different than dealing with Black Mercy, causing Scarecrow to ask her what is Black Mercy out of curiosity, causing Supergirl to describe it as an evil space plant.

Characters who have experienced the Black Mercy include:
Superman sees himself on a still-intact Krypton with his biological parents, married to a retired actress named Lyla, and a son named Van. 
Batman envisions a life in which his parents were not murdered during his childhood, and he is married to Kathy Kane.
Mongul envisions a life in which he successfully kills Superman, before setting out across the universe, killing all of his enemies, entire populations kneeling before him amid his destruction of countless galaxies.
Green Arrow envisions a life in which he is married to Sandra "Moonday" Hawke, and in addition to their older son Connor, they have a younger son, and a newborn third. When Mongul uses the Black Mercy on him, Green Arrow was caught along with Hal Jordan, with the result that he saw what Hal believed would be his perfect life.
Hal Jordan envisions a life in which his parents and his siblings are present in his life, and Sinestro is a friend who fights by his side as a member of the Green Lantern Corps. When Mongul uses the Black Mercy on him, Jordan was caught in the same illusion as Oliver Queen, which resulted in Jordan creating what he believed would be Queen's perfect life rather than Queen experiencing his own idea of a perfect life, allowing Queen to see through its simulation and thus awaken from it.

In mythology
 Aglaophotis: A type of Peony said to be magical
Austras koks: a tree which grows from the start of the Sun's daily journey across the sky in Latvian mythology
 Barnacle tree: mythical tree believed in the Middle Ages to have barnacles that opened to reveal geese. The story may have started from goose barnacles growing on driftwood.
Fern flower: a magic plant in Baltic mythology thought to only bloom one night, sought by lovers
Lotus tree: a plant in Greek mythology bearing a fruit that caused a pleasant drowsiness. It may have been real (a type of jujube (perhaps Ziziphus lotus) or the date palm).
Moly: a magic herb in Greek mythology with a black root and white blossoms
Raskovnik: a magic plant in Serbian mythology which can open any lock
Vegetable Lamb of Tartary: a mythical plant supposed by medieval thinkers to explain the existence of cotton
Yggdrasil: the World tree of Norse mythology

Hoaxes
Man-eating plant or Madagascar tree: a fictitious tree in the forests of Madagascar. There are stories of similar trees in the jungles of Mindanao Island in the Philippines. The tree is said to have a gray trunk and animated vine-like stems used to capture and kill humans and other large animals. Comparable plants are mentioned in tall tales and fiction.
Spaghetti tree: a tree from which spaghetti is harvested. It was an April Fool's Day joke launched by the BBC TV programme Panorama in 1957.

See also
 Talking trees
 Tree (mythology)
 World tree
 Tree of life (disambiguation)

Further reading

Notes

References

 
Plants, List of fictional